Oswaldo Patricio Vintimilla Cabrera (Cuenca, Azuay Province, August 2, 1966), is an Ecuadorian priest, who serves as the Bishop of Azogues.

Life 
Cabrera was born in the city of Cuenca, Province of Azuay, whose parents are of Azoguean descent. He completed his primary studies at the Escuela Particular "Arzobispo Serrano", and his secondary studies at the Colegio Universitario Miguel Cordero Crespo.

He completed his studies in Philosophy and Theology at the Seminario Mayor San León Magno-Cuenca.

Priesthood 

He was ordained a priest on November 17, 1990, by the then Archbishop of Cuenca, Luis Alberto Luna Tobar.

The positions held by the current bishop were the following:

 Parish priest in charge of Cumbe and La Victoria del Portete, Cuenca (1990)
 Vicar of the Vicar of Gualaceo (1990-1991)
 Parish priest of San Juan Bautista in Nabón, Cochapata, Las Nieves and the indigenous zone of Zhiña (1991-2001)
 Parish priest in San Felipe in Oña (1995)
 Parish priest of Our Lady of Mount Carmel in Tarqui (2004-2013)
 Pastor of the Holy Spirit in Baños (2013)
 Chaplain of the annexed campuses of the Catholic University of Cuenca (from 1990 to date)
 Religious assistant of the Contemplative Monasteries of the Franciscan Conceptionist Nuns and the * * * Carmelite Nuns, Cuenca (from 1991 to date)
 Chaplain of Telecuenca (current TV Academy) (1994-1996)
 Delegate to the Presbytery Council in the Archdiocese of Cuenca (1993-1996)
 Coordinator of the Liturgy Commission in the Archdiocese of Cuenca (1998-2000)
 Archdiocesan Vicar for Indigenous Ministry (1999-2001)
 Founding Partner of the César Cordero Moscoso Educational Foundation for Development (2002)
 Delegate to the Presbytery Council of the Archdiocese of Cuenca (2007-2010)
 Member of the Pastoral Commission of the Traveler Child (2008)
 Coordinator of the Liturgy Commission in the Archdiocese of Cuenca (2012-2014).

Episcopate

Bishop of Azogues 
He was ordained V bishop of the capital of the Province of Cañar on August 20, 2016, by the envoy of Pope Francis, Mons. Giacomo Guido Ottonello.

Works 
Among his works is that he is carrying out the modernization of the Cathedral of Azogues, and therefore is the composer of the famous song Niño Manuelito and at the same time promoter of the festival that takes place on the second Sunday of January of each year.

References 

1966 births
21st-century Roman Catholic bishops in Ecuador
Roman Catholic bishops of Azogues
Living people